Berrien may refer to:

People
Berrien (surname)

Places
Berrien County, Georgia
Berrien County, Michigan
Berrien Charter Township, Michigan
Berrien City, New Jersey
Berrien, Finistère, a commune of the Finistère département in France

See also
Berrian (disambiguation)